Albert Roy Brown (14 August 1917 – 31 January 2005) was an English professional footballer who played as a winger. He made appearances in the football league with Nottingham Forest, Wrexham and Mansfield Town.

References

1917 births
2005 deaths
English footballers
Association football wingers
Carlton Town F.C. players
Nottingham Forest F.C. players
Wrexham A.F.C. players
Mansfield Town F.C. players
English Football League players

Footballers from Nottingham